Phyllalia thunbergii is a moth in the family Eupterotidae. It was described by Jean Baptiste Boisduval in 1847. It is found in KwaZulu-Natal in South Africa.

References

Endemic moths of South Africa
Moths described in 1847
Eupterotinae